Little Texas is an unincorporated community in Macon County, Alabama, United States.

References

Unincorporated communities in Macon County, Alabama
Unincorporated communities in Alabama